Butre is a village in the Ahanta West district, district in the Western Region of Ghana. Butre contains the Fort Batenstein Castle.

References

Populated places in Ahanta West Municipal District